The crested oropendola (Psarocolius decumanus), also known as the Suriname crested oropendola or the cornbird, is a New World tropical icterid bird. It is a resident breeder in lowland South America east of the Andes, from Panama and Colombia south to northern Argentina, as well as on Trinidad and Tobago. If the genus Gymnostinax for the Montezuma oropendola and its closest relatives were considered valid, this species would probably belong in that genus (Price & Lanyon 2002).

It is a common bird, seen alone or in small flocks foraging in trees for large insects, fruit, seeds and some nectar. The male is 46 cm long and weighs 300 g; the smaller female is 37 cm long and weighs 180 g.

The plumage of the crested oropendola has a musty smell due to the oil from the preen gland.

Description

Adult males are mainly black with a chestnut rump and a tail which is bright yellow apart from two dark central feathers. There is a long narrow crest which is often difficult to see. The iris is blue and the long bill is whitish. Females are similar but smaller, duller, and crestless.

Taxonomy

There are four subspecies:
 P. d. insularis of Trinidad and Tobago has much chestnut edging on the feathers of the wings and back.
 The nominate subspecies P. d.  decumanus occurs from Colombia south to the Amazon in Brazil.
 P. d. maculosus breeds south of the Amazon. It is browner, and has yellow feathers scattered through the body plumage.
 The northern form P. d. melanterus of Panama and western Colombia is very similar, differing only in the amount of chestnut feather tipping, and is of dubious status.

Behaviour

The crested oropendola inhabits forest edges and clearings. It is a colonial breeder which builds a hanging woven nest, more than 125 cm long, high in a tree. It lays two blotched blue-grey eggs which hatch in 15–19 days, with another 24–36 days to fledging.

Each colony has a dominant male, which mates with most of the females following an elaborate bowing display. There may be 15-30 females and only 3-4 males. Outside the breeding season, this species is quite mobile, with some seasonal movements.

The distinctive songs of the male include a descending call reminiscent of sliding one's hand on a piano. Both sexes have a loud clack call.

The crested oropendola is a host of the Acanthocephalan intestinal parasite Apororhynchus aculeatus.

References

Other sources
 ffrench, Richard; O'Neill, John Patton & Eckelberry, Don R. (1991): A guide to the birds of Trinidad and Tobago (2nd edition). Comstock Publishing, Ithaca, N.Y.. 
Hilty, Steven L. (2003): Birds of Venezuela. Christopher Helm, London. 
Jaramillo, Alvaro & Burke, Peter (1999): New World Blackbirds. Christopher Helm, London.

External links

 Crested oropendola videos, photos and sounds - Internet Bird Collection

crested oropendola
Birds of Panama
Birds of Trinidad and Tobago
Birds of South America
crested oropendola
Birds of the Amazon Basin
Birds of Brazil